The 2017 Trans-Am Series was the 49th running of the Sports Car Club of America's Trans-Am Series, and consisted of 13 races. The Detroit race was for TA and TA2 only, and the Circuit of the Americas race was a shared race.

The rules set from the end of the 2016 season featured four classes: TA, TA2, TA3, and TA4 was retained for 2017.

A separate "West Coast" championship with 3 races separate from the main championship and one round shared with the main championship, the race at Circuit of the Americas was contested for the first time ever.

Schedule changes
The New Jersey Motorsports Park and Watkins Glen races moved from the spring to the fall while Homestead-Miami Speedway moved from the fall to the Spring. NOLA Motorsports Park was dropped from the schedule, while the series ran at the Indianapolis Motor Speedway road course for the first time, sharing a weekend with the Sportscar Vintage Racing Association.

Television
The following events were televised on CBS Sports Network on a tape-delay basis:
Detroit
Indianapolis
Brainerd
Mid Ohio
Road America
Circuit of the Americas

Calendar and results

Main Championship

West Coast Championship

Driver standings (Main championship)

TA

TA2

TA3

TA4

Driver standings (West Coast championship)

TA

TA2

TA3

TA4

References

Trans-Am Series
TransAm